Saint-Maurice-lès-Charencey is a former commune in the Orne department in north-western France. On 1 January 2018, it was merged into the new commune of Charencey.

See also
Communes of the Orne department

References

Saintmauricelescharencey